The 1945–46 season was Colchester United's fourth season in their history and their fourth in the Southern League. It was also their first since the end of World War II hostilities. Alongside competing in the Southern League, the club also participated in the FA Cup and Southern League Cup. Relying heavily on guest appearances of players from other clubs, Colchester United finished in 8th position in the Southern League, with a total of 81 different players registering appearances over the course of the season.

Season overview
The determination of a number of club directors and former player Syd Fieldus saw the club remain alive yet dormant during the war years. Fieldus was appointed secretary-manager, and attended the first post-war Southern League meeting during the summer of 1945. Following late changes to the structure of the competitions, where a national league was created over an Eastern and Western division, the club were close to pulling out of the competition entirely, risking falling further down the football pyramid. However, the club were to remain after the supporters club pledged to fund an average of £50 required for away travel to the likes of Cardiff City, Hereford United and Worcester City.

Fieldus liaised with Major Dai Rees to forge a strong relationship with Colchester Garrison, as the club on sported four contracted players. The first-team was complemented by a number of servicemen of varying degrees of ability, which meant that by the end of the campaign, 81 different players were used to compete in only 31 league and cup games. Players were often registered just moments before a scheduled kick-off time. After competing in all 20 scheduled games for the season, Fieldus urged the board to appoint a full-time manager for the 1946–47 season.

Players

Transfers

In

Out

 Total incoming:  ~ £800

Guest players

Loans in

Match details

Friendlies

Southern League

League table

Matches

FA Cup

Southern League Cup

Squad statistics

Appearances and goals

|-
!colspan="14"|Players who appeared for Colchester who left during the season

|}

Goalscorers

Captains
Number of games played as team captain.

Clean sheets
Number of games goalkeepers kept a clean sheet.

Player debuts
Players making their first-team Colchester United debut in a fully competitive match.

See also
List of Colchester United F.C. seasons

Notes

References

General

Specific

1945-46
English football clubs 1945–46 season